Chilomima is a genus of moths of the family Crambidae. It contains only one species, Chilomima clarkei, which is found in Colombia, Paraguay and Venezuela.

References

Glaphyriinae
Crambidae genera
Taxa named by Eugene G. Munroe